Martha Carol (Stafford) Wilkinson (August 28, 1941 – May 7, 2014) was an American businesswoman and politician. She served as the First Lady of Kentucky from 1987 to 1991.  Born in Casey County, Kentucky, she was the wife of former Kentucky Governor Wallace G. Wilkinson.

In 1960, she married Wallace G. Wilkinson and together they started the Kentucky Paperback Gallery in 1963 which later became Wallace's College Book Company.  Martha Wilkinson was business manager of the Wilkinson Farms.

The gown Wilkinson wore at her husband's inauguration was a gift from her sister, Catherine Rubards. She wore it with a gold, ruby and diamond necklace given to her by Governor Wilkinson.

Martha Wilkinson created "Martha's Army" to fight adult illiteracy.  Wilkinson's group used techniques such as a telephone hotline, (800)-GED-ARMY, and financial incentives to encourage Kentucky high school dropouts to earn a General Educational Development (GED) certificate. In 1990, country-music singer Waylon Jennings, who dropped out of school in the 10th grade, earned a GED through Martha's Army.

In 1991, when her husband was term limited from seeking a second consecutive term, Wilkinson announced her candidacy for governor.  She withdrew from the race before the Democratic primary when polls showed her trailing Lt. Gov. Brereton Jones. She died on May 7, 2014, in Sarasota, Florida.

References

First Ladies and Gentlemen of Kentucky
Kentucky Democrats
People from Casey County, Kentucky
Women in Kentucky politics
1941 births
2014 deaths
21st-century American women